The Gailes Golf Club is a golf club in Wacol, Queensland, Australia, 20 minutes south of Brisbane. It hosted the Australian Open in 1955 with the winner was Bobby Locke from South Africa.

References

External links

Gailes Golf Club Course review, Golf Australia

Golf clubs and courses in Queensland
Sporting clubs in Brisbane
Sports venues in Brisbane